The Ernée is a  long river in the department of Mayenne, Pays de la Loire, northwestern France. Its source is in the commune of Levaré, and it flows through the communes of Ernée, Chailland, Andouillé and Saint-Germain-le-Fouilloux, before flowing into the river Mayenne (right bank) at Saint-Jean-sur-Mayenne.

References

Rivers of Mayenne
Rivers of France
Rivers of Pays de la Loire